This article shows the records set by the Hunter Mariners in their one and only season in the 1997 Super League competition.

Game Records

Biggest Wins

Biggest Losses

Most Points in a Game (Win)

Most Points in a Game (Loss)

Most Points Conceded in a Game

Highest Scoring Games (Win and Loss)

Lowest Scoring Games (Win and Loss)

Best/Worst Start to a Season
The Hunter Mariners only played in one season. In this season, the team lost five of their first six games.

Top Home Attendances

Top Away Attendances

Individual Records

Most First Grade Games

Most Points in a First Grade Career

Most Tries in a Match

Most Goals in a Match

Most Points in a Match

Most Tries in a Season

Most Points in a Season

Streaks

Longest Winning Streaks
 4 Matches (16 May 1997, Round 11 to 5 July 1997, Round 14)

Longest Losing Streaks
 4 Matches (13 July 1997, Round 15 to 24 August 1997, Round 18)

Biggest Wins and Losses (by Opponent)

Head To Head Records

Finals Records
The Hunter Mariners finished sixth in the ten competition, just missing out on playing in the finals.

Records